The lanthanide or lanthanoid series of chemical elements comprises the 15 metallic chemical elements with atomic numbers 57–71, from lanthanum through lutetium. These elements, along with the chemically similar elements scandium and yttrium, are often collectively known as the rare-earth elements or rare-earth metals.

The informal chemical symbol Ln is used in general discussions of lanthanide chemistry to refer to any lanthanide. All but one of the lanthanides are f-block elements, corresponding to the filling of the 4f electron shell. Lutetium is a d-block element (thus also a transition metal), and on this basis its inclusion has been questioned; however, it (as well as scandium and yttrium in group 3) behaves similarly to the other 14. All lanthanide elements form trivalent cations, Ln3+, whose chemistry is largely determined by the ionic radius, which decreases steadily from lanthanum (La) to lutetium (Lu).

These elements are called lanthanides because the elements in the series are chemically similar to lanthanum. Since "lanthanide" means "like lanthanum", it has been argued that lanthanum cannot logically be a lanthanide, but the International Union of Pure and Applied Chemistry (IUPAC) acknowledges its inclusion based on common usage.

In presentations of the periodic table, the f-block elements are customarily shown as two additional rows below the main body of the table. This convention is entirely a matter of aesthetics and formatting practicality; a rarely used wide-formatted periodic table inserts the 4f and 5f series in their proper places, as parts of the table's sixth and seventh rows (periods).

The 1985 IUPAC "Red Book" (p. 45) recommends using "lanthanoid" instead of "lanthanide", as the ending "-ide" normally indicates a negative ion. However, owing to wide current use, "lanthanide" is still allowed.

Etymology
The term "lanthanide" was introduced by Victor Goldschmidt in 1925. Despite their abundance, the technical term "lanthanides" is interpreted to reflect a sense of elusiveness on the part of these elements, as it comes from the Greek λανθανειν (lanthanein), "to lie hidden". 

Rather than referring to their natural abundance, the word reflects their property of "hiding" behind each other in minerals. The term derives from lanthanum, first discovered in 1838, at that time a so-called new rare-earth element "lying hidden" or "escaping notice" in a cerium mineral, and it is an irony that lanthanum was later identified as the first in an entire series of chemically similar elements and gave its name to the whole series. 

Together with the two elements at the top of group 3, scandium and yttrium, the trivial name "rare earths" is sometimes used to describe all the lanthanides; a definition of rare earths including the group 3, lanthanide, and actinide elements is also occasionally seen, and rarely Sc + Y + lanthanides + thorium. The "earth" in the name "rare earths" arises from the minerals from which they were isolated, which were uncommon oxide-type minerals. However, these elements are neither rare in abundance nor "earths" (an obsolete term for water-insoluble strongly basic oxides of electropositive metals incapable of being smelted into metal using late 18th century technology). Group 2 is known as the alkaline earth elements for much the same reason.

The "rare" in the "rare earths" name has much more to do with the difficulty of separating out each of the individual lanthanide elements than scarcity of any of them. By way of the Greek "dysprositos" for "hard to get at," element 66, dysprosium was similarly named; lanthanum itself is named after a word for "hidden." The elements 57 (La) to 71 (Lu) are very similar chemically to one another and frequently occur together in nature, often anywhere from three to all 15 of the lanthanides (along with yttrium as a 16th) occur in minerals such as samarskite, monazite and many others which can also contain the other two group 3 elements as well as thorium and occasionally other actinides as well. A majority of the rare earths were discovered at the same mine in Ytterby, Sweden and four of them are named (yttrium, ytterbium, erbium, terbium) after the village and a fifth (holmium) after Stockholm; scandium is named after Scandinavia, thulium after the old name Thule, and the immediately-following group 4 element (number 72) hafnium is named for the Latin name of the city of Copenhagen.

Samarskite (a mineral which is the source of the name of the element samarium) and other similar minerals in particular also have these elements in association with the nearby metals tantalum, niobium, hafnium, zirconium, vanadium, and titanium, from group 4 and group 5 often in similar oxidation states. Monazite is a phosphate of numerous group 3 + lanthanide + actinide metals and mined especially for the thorium content and specific rare earths especially lanthanum, yttrium and cerium. Cerium and lanthanum as well as other members of the rare earth series are often produced as a metal called mischmetal containing a variable mixture of these elements with cerium and lanthanum predominating; it has direct uses such as lighter flints and other spark sources which do not require extensive purification of one of these metals.  

There are also rare earth-bearing minerals based on group 2 elements such as yttrocalcite, yttrocerite, yttrofluorite which vary in content of yttrium, cerium, and lanthanum in a particular as well as varying amounts of the others. Other lanthanide/rare earth minerals include bastnäsite, florencite, chernovite, perovskite, xenotime, cerite, gadolinite, lanthanite, fergusonite, polycrase, blomstrandine, håleniusite, miserite, loparite, lepersonnite, euxenite, all of which have a range of relative element concentration and may have the symbol of a predominating one such as monazite-ce; group 3 elements do not occur as native element minerals in the fashion of gold, silver, tantalum and many others on earth but may in lunar regolith.  Very rare cerium, lanthanum, and presumably other lanthanide/group 3 halides, feldspars and garnets are also known to exist.

All of this is the result of the order in which the electron shells of these elements are filled—the outermost has the same configuration for all of them, and a deeper shell is progressively filled with electrons as the atomic number increases from 57 towards 71. For many years, mixtures of more than one rare earth were considered to be single elements, such as neodymium and praseodymium being thought to be the single element didymium and so on. Very small differences in solubility are used in solvent and ion-exchange purification methods for these elements which require a great deal of repeating to get a purified metal.  The refined metals and their compounds have subtle and stark differences amongst themselves in electronic, electrical, optical, and magnetic properties which account for their many niche uses.

By way of examples of the term meaning the above considerations rather than their scarcity, cerium is the 26th most abundant element in the Earth's crust and more abundant than copper, neodymium is more abundant than gold; thulium (the second least common naturally occurring lanthanide) is more abundant than iodine, which is itself common enough for biology to have evolved critical usages thereof, and even the lone radioactive element in the series, promethium, is more common than the two rarest naturally occurring elements, francium and astatine, combined.

Physical properties of the elements

* Between initial Xe and final 6s2 electronic shells

** Sm has a close packed structure like most of the lanthanides but has an unusual 9 layer repeat

Gschneider and Daane (1988) attribute the trend in melting point which increases across the series, (lanthanum (920 °C) – lutetium (1622 °C)) to the extent of hybridization of the 6s, 5d, and 4f orbitals. The hybridization is believed to be at its greatest for cerium, which has the lowest melting point of all, 795 °C.
The lanthanide metals are soft; their hardness increases across the series. Europium stands out, as it has the lowest density in the series at 5.24 g/cm3 and the largest metallic radius in the series at 208.4 pm. It can be compared to barium, which has a metallic radius of 222 pm. It is believed that the metal contains the larger Eu2+ ion and that there are only two electrons in the conduction band. Ytterbium also has a large metallic radius, and a similar explanation is suggested.
The resistivities of the lanthanide metals are relatively high, ranging from 29 to 134 μΩ·cm. These values can be compared to a good conductor such as aluminium, which has a resistivity of 2.655 μΩ·cm.
With the exceptions of La, Yb, and Lu (which have no unpaired f electrons), the lanthanides are strongly paramagnetic, and this is reflected in their magnetic susceptibilities. Gadolinium becomes ferromagnetic at below 16 °C (Curie point). The other heavier lanthanides – terbium, dysprosium, holmium, erbium, thulium, and ytterbium – become ferromagnetic at much lower temperatures.

Chemistry and compounds

* Not including initial [Xe] core

f → f transitions are symmetry forbidden (or Laporte-forbidden), which is also true of transition metals. However, transition metals are able to use vibronic coupling to break this rule. The valence orbitals in lanthanides are almost entirely non-bonding and as such little effective vibronic coupling takes, hence the spectra from f → f transitions are much weaker and narrower than those from d → d transitions. In general this makes the colors of lanthanide complexes far fainter than those of transition metal complexes.

Effect of 4f orbitals
Going across the lanthanides in the periodic table, the 4f orbitals are usually being filled. The effect of the 4f orbitals on the chemistry of the lanthanides is profound and is the factor that distinguishes them from the transition metals. There are seven 4f orbitals, and there are two different ways in which they are depicted: as a "cubic set" or as a general set. The cubic set is fz3,  fxz2, fyz2,  fxyz, fz(x2−y2),  fx(x2−3y2) and fy(3x2−y2). The 4f orbitals penetrate the [Xe] core and are isolated, and thus they do not participate in bonding. This explains why crystal field effects are small and why they do not form π bonds. As there are seven 4f orbitals, the number of unpaired electrons can be as high as 7, which gives rise to the large magnetic moments observed for lanthanide compounds. 

Measuring the magnetic moment can be used to investigate the 4f electron configuration, and this is a useful tool in providing an insight into the chemical bonding. The lanthanide contraction, i.e. the reduction in size of the Ln3+ ion from La3+ (103 pm) to Lu3+ (86.1 pm), is often explained by the poor shielding of the 5s and 5p electrons by the 4f electrons.

The electronic structure of the lanthanide elements, with minor exceptions, is [Xe]6s24fn. The chemistry of the lanthanides is dominated by the +3 oxidation state, and in LnIII compounds the 6s electrons and (usually) one 4f electron are lost and the ions have the configuration [Xe]4fm. All the lanthanide elements exhibit the oxidation state +3. In addition, Ce3+ can lose its single f electron to form Ce4+ with the stable electronic configuration of xenon. Also, Eu3+ can gain an electron to form Eu2+ with the f7 configuration that has the extra stability of a half-filled shell. Other than Ce(IV) and Eu(II), none of the lanthanides are stable in oxidation states other than +3 in aqueous solution. 

In terms of reduction potentials, the Ln0/3+ couples are nearly the same for all lanthanides, ranging from −1.99 (for Eu) to −2.35 V (for Pr). Thus these metals are highly reducing, with reducing power similar to alkaline earth metals such as Mg (−2.36 V).

Lanthanide oxidation states

The ionization energies for the lanthanides can be compared with aluminium. In aluminium the sum of the first three ionization energies is 5139 kJ·mol−1, whereas the lanthanides fall in the range 3455 – 4186 kJ·mol−1. This correlates with the highly reactive nature of the lanthanides.

The sum of the first two ionization energies for europium, 1632 kJ·mol−1 can be compared with that of barium 1468.1 kJ·mol−1 and europium's third ionization energy is the highest of the lanthanides. The sum of the first two ionization energies for ytterbium are the second lowest in the series and its third ionization energy is the second highest. The high third ionization energy for Eu and Yb correlate with the half filling 4f7 and complete filling 4f14 of the 4f subshell, and the stability afforded by such configurations due to exchange energy. Europium and ytterbium form salt like compounds with Eu2+ and Yb2+, for example the salt like dihydrides. Both europium and ytterbium dissolve in liquid ammonia forming solutions of Ln2+(NH3)x again demonstrating their similarities to the alkaline earth metals.

The relative ease with which the 4th electron can be removed in cerium and (to a lesser extent praseodymium) indicates why Ce(IV) and Pr(IV) compounds can be formed, for example CeO2 is formed rather than Ce2O3 when cerium reacts with oxygen.

Separation of lanthanides
The similarity in ionic radius between adjacent lanthanide elements makes it difficult to separate them from each other in naturally occurring ores and other mixtures. Historically, the very laborious processes of cascading and fractional crystallization were used. Because the lanthanide ions have slightly different radii, the lattice energy of their salts and hydration energies of the ions will be slightly different, leading to a small difference in solubility. Salts of the formula Ln(NO3)3·2NH4NO3·4H2O can be used. Industrially, the elements are separated from each other by solvent extraction. Typically an aqueous solution of nitrates is extracted into kerosene containing tri-n-butylphosphate. The strength of the complexes formed increases as the ionic radius decreases, so solubility in the organic phase increases. Complete separation can be achieved continuously by use of countercurrent exchange methods. The elements can also be separated by ion-exchange chromatography, making use of the fact that the stability constant for formation of EDTA complexes increases for log K ≈ 15.5 for [La(EDTA)]− to log K ≈ 19.8 for [Lu(EDTA)]−.

Coordination chemistry and catalysis
When in the form of coordination complexes, lanthanides exist overwhelmingly in their +3 oxidation state, although particularly stable 4f configurations can also give +4 (Ce, Tb) or +2 (Eu, Yb) ions. All of these forms are strongly electropositive and thus lanthanide ions are hard Lewis acids. The oxidation states are also very stable; with the exceptions of SmI2 and cerium(IV) salts, lanthanides are not used for redox chemistry. 4f electrons have a high probability of being found close to the nucleus and are thus strongly affected as the nuclear charge increases across the series; this results in a corresponding decrease in ionic radii referred to as the lanthanide contraction.

The low probability of the 4f electrons existing at the outer region of the atom or ion permits little effective overlap between the orbitals of a lanthanide ion and any binding ligand. Thus lanthanide complexes typically have little or no covalent character and are not influenced by orbital geometries. The lack of orbital interaction also means that varying the metal typically has little effect on the complex (other than size), especially when compared to transition metals. Complexes are held together by weaker electrostatic forces which are omni-directional and thus the ligands alone dictate the symmetry and coordination of complexes. Steric factors therefore dominate, with coordinative saturation of the metal being balanced against inter-ligand repulsion. This results in a diverse range of coordination geometries, many of which are irregular, and also manifests itself in the highly fluxional nature of the complexes. As there is no energetic reason to be locked into a single geometry, rapid intramolecular and intermolecular ligand exchange will take place. This typically results in complexes that rapidly fluctuate between all possible configurations.

Many of these features make lanthanide complexes effective catalysts. Hard Lewis acids are able to polarise bonds upon coordination and thus alter the electrophilicity of compounds, with a classic example being the Luche reduction. The large size of the ions coupled with their labile ionic bonding allows even bulky coordinating species to bind and dissociate rapidly, resulting in very high turnover rates; thus excellent yields can often be achieved with loadings of only a few mol%. The lack of orbital interactions combined with the lanthanide contraction means that the lanthanides change in size across the series but that their chemistry remains much the same. This allows for easy tuning of the steric environments and examples exist where this has been used to improve the catalytic activity of the complex and change the nuclearity of metal clusters.

Despite this, the use of lanthanide coordination complexes as homogeneous catalysts is largely restricted to the laboratory and there are currently few examples them being used on an industrial scale. Lanthanides exist in many forms other than coordination complexes and many of these are industrially useful. In particular lanthanide metal oxides are used as heterogeneous catalysts in various industrial processes.

Ln(III) compounds
The trivalent lanthanides mostly form ionic salts. The trivalent ions are hard acceptors and form more stable complexes with oxygen-donor ligands than with nitrogen-donor ligands. The larger ions are 9-coordinate in aqueous solution, [Ln(H2O)9]3+ but the smaller ions are 8-coordinate, [Ln(H2O)8]3+. There is some evidence that the later lanthanides have more water molecules in the second coordination sphere. Complexation with monodentate ligands is generally weak because it is difficult to displace water molecules from the first coordination sphere. Stronger complexes are formed with chelating ligands because of the chelate effect, such as the tetra-anion derived from 1,4,7,10-tetraazacyclododecane-1,4,7,10-tetraacetic acid (DOTA).

Ln(II) and Ln(IV) compounds
The most common divalent derivatives of the lanthanides are for Eu(II), which achieves a favorable f7 configuration. Divalent halide derivatives are known for all of the lanthanides. They are either conventional salts or are Ln(III) "electride"-like salts. The simple salts include YbI2, EuI2, and SmI2. The electride-like salts, described as Ln3+, 2I−, e−, include LaI2, CeI2 and GdI2. Many of the iodides form soluble complexes with ethers, e.g. TmI2(dimethoxyethane)3. Samarium(II) iodide is a useful reducing agent. Ln(II) complexes can be synthesized by transmetalation reactions. The normal range of oxidation states can be expanded via the use of sterically bulky cyclopentadienyl ligands, in this way many lanthanides can be isolated as Ln(II) compounds.

Ce(IV) in ceric ammonium nitrate is a useful oxidizing agent. The Ce(IV) is the exception owing to the tendency to form an unfilled f shell. Otherwise tetravalent lanthanides are rare. However, recently Tb(IV) and Pr(IV) complexes have been shown to exist.

Hydrides

Lanthanide metals react exothermically with hydrogen to form LnH2, dihydrides. With the exception of Eu and Yb, which resemble the Ba and Ca hydrides (non-conducting, transparent salt-like compounds),they form black pyrophoric, conducting compounds where the metal sub-lattice is face centred cubic and the H atoms occupy tetrahedral sites. Further hydrogenation produces a trihydride which is non-stoichiometric, non-conducting, more salt like. The formation of trihydride is associated with and increase in 8–10% volume and this is linked to greater localization of charge on the hydrogen atoms which become more anionic (H− hydride anion) in character.

Halides

The only tetrahalides known are the tetrafluorides of cerium, praseodymium, terbium, neodymium and dysprosium, the last two known only under matrix isolation conditions.
All of the lanthanides form trihalides with fluorine, chlorine, bromine and iodine. They are all high melting and predominantly ionic in nature. The fluorides are only slightly soluble in water and are not sensitive to air, and this contrasts with the other halides which are air sensitive, readily soluble in water and react at high temperature to form oxohalides.

The trihalides were important as pure metal can be prepared from them. In the gas phase the trihalides are planar or approximately planar, the lighter lanthanides have a lower % of dimers, the heavier lanthanides a higher proportion. The dimers have a similar structure to Al2Cl6.

Some of the dihalides are conducting while the rest are insulators. The conducting forms can be considered as LnIII electride compounds where the electron is delocalised into a conduction band, Ln3+ (X−)2(e−). All of the diiodides have relatively short metal-metal separations. The CuTi2 structure of the lanthanum, cerium and praseodymium diiodides along with HP-NdI2 contain 44 nets of metal and iodine atoms with short metal-metal bonds (393-386 La-Pr). these compounds should be considered to be two-dimensional metals (two-dimensional in the same way that graphite is). The salt-like dihalides include those of Eu, Dy, Tm, and Yb. The formation of a relatively stable +2 oxidation state for Eu and Yb is usually explained by the stability (exchange energy) of half filled (f7) and fully filled f14. GdI2 possesses the layered MoS2 structure, is ferromagnetic and exhibits colossal magnetoresistance

The sesquihalides Ln2X3 and the Ln7I12 compounds listed in the table contain metal clusters, discrete Ln6I12 clusters in Ln7I12 and condensed clusters forming chains in the sesquihalides. Scandium forms a similar cluster compound with chlorine, Sc7Cl12 Unlike many transition metal clusters these lanthanide clusters do not have strong metal-metal interactions and this is due to the low number of valence electrons involved, but instead are stabilised by the surrounding halogen atoms.

LaI is the only known monohalide. Prepared from the reaction of LaI3 and La metal, it has a NiAs type structure and can be formulated La3+ (I−)(e−)2.

Oxides and hydroxides
All of the lanthanides form sesquioxides, Ln2O3. The lighter/larger lanthanides adopt a hexagonal 7-coordinate structure while the heavier/smaller ones adopt a cubic 6-coordinate "C-M2O3" structure. All of the sesquioxides are basic, and absorb water and carbon dioxide from air to form carbonates, hydroxides and hydroxycarbonates. They dissolve in acids to form salts.

Cerium forms a stoichiometric dioxide, CeO2, where cerium has an oxidation state of +4.  CeO2 is basic and dissolves with difficulty in acid to form Ce4+ solutions, from which CeIV salts can be isolated, for example the hydrated nitrate Ce(NO3)4.5H2O.  CeO2 is used as an oxidation catalyst in catalytic converters. Praseodymium and terbium form non-stoichiometric oxides containing LnIV, although more extreme reaction conditions can produce stoichiometric (or near stoichiometric) PrO2 and TbO2.

Europium and ytterbium form salt-like monoxides, EuO and YbO, which have a rock salt structure. EuO is ferromagnetic at low temperatures, and is a semiconductor with possible applications in spintronics. A mixed EuII/EuIII oxide Eu3O4 can be produced by reducing Eu2O3 in a stream of hydrogen. Neodymium and samarium also form monoxides, but these are shiny conducting solids, although the existence of samarium monoxide is considered dubious.

All of the lanthanides form hydroxides, Ln(OH)3.  With the exception of lutetium hydroxide, which has a cubic structure, they have the hexagonal UCl3 structure. The hydroxides can be precipitated from solutions of LnIII. They can also be formed by the reaction of the sesquioxide, Ln2O3, with water, but although this reaction is thermodynamically favorable it is kinetically slow for the heavier members of the series. Fajans' rules indicate that the smaller Ln3+ ions will be more polarizing and their salts correspondingly less ionic.  The hydroxides of the heavier lanthanides become less basic, for example Yb(OH)3 and Lu(OH)3 are still basic hydroxides but will dissolve in hot concentrated NaOH.

Chalcogenides (S, Se, Te)
All of the lanthanides form Ln2Q3 (Q= S, Se, Te). The sesquisulfides can be produced by reaction of the elements or (with the exception of Eu2S3) sulfidizing the oxide (Ln2O3) with H2S. The sesquisulfides, Ln2S3 generally lose sulfur when heated and can form a range of compositions between Ln2S3 and Ln3S4. The sesquisulfides are insulators but some of the Ln3S4 are metallic conductors (e.g. Ce3S4) formulated (Ln3+)3 (S2−)4 (e−), while others (e.g. Eu3S4 and Sm3S4) are semiconductors. Structurally the sesquisulfides adopt structures that vary according to the size of the Ln metal. The lighter and larger lanthanides favoring 7-coordinate metal atoms, the heaviest and smallest lanthanides (Yb and Lu) favoring 6 coordination and the rest structures with a mixture of 6 and 7 coordination. 

Polymorphism is common amongst the sesquisulfides. The colors of the sesquisulfides vary metal to metal and depend on the polymorphic form. The colors of the γ-sesquisulfides are La2S3, white/yellow; Ce2S3, dark red; Pr2S3, green; Nd2S3, light green; Gd2S3, sand; Tb2S3, light yellow and Dy2S3, orange. The shade of γ-Ce2S3 can be varied by doping with Na or Ca with hues ranging from dark red to yellow, and Ce2S3 based pigments are used commercially and are seen as low toxicity substitutes for cadmium based pigments.

All of the lanthanides form monochalcogenides, LnQ, (Q= S, Se, Te). The majority of the monochalcogenides are conducting, indicating a formulation LnIIIQ2−(e-) where the electron is in conduction bands. The exceptions are SmQ, EuQ and YbQ which are semiconductors or insulators but exhibit a pressure induced transition to a conducting state.
Compounds LnQ2 are known but these do not contain LnIV but are LnIII compounds containing polychalcogenide anions.

Oxysulfides Ln2O2S are well known, they all have the same structure with 7-coordinate Ln atoms, and 3 sulfur and 4 oxygen atoms as near neighbours.
Doping these with other lanthanide elements produces phosphors. As an example, gadolinium oxysulfide, Gd2O2S doped with Tb3+ produces visible photons when irradiated with high energy X-rays and is used as a scintillator in flat panel detectors.
When mischmetal, an alloy of lanthanide metals, is added to molten steel to remove oxygen and sulfur, stable oxysulfides are produced that form an immiscible solid.

Pnictides (group 15)
All of the lanthanides form a mononitride, LnN, with the rock salt structure. The mononitrides have attracted interest because of their unusual physical properties. SmN and EuN are reported as being "half metals". NdN, GdN, TbN and DyN are ferromagnetic, SmN is antiferromagnetic. Applications in the field of spintronics are being investigated.
CeN is unusual as it is a metallic conductor, contrasting with the other nitrides also with the other cerium pnictides. A simple description is Ce4+N3− (e–) but the interatomic distances are a better match for the trivalent state rather than for the tetravalent state. A number of different explanations have been offered.
The nitrides can be prepared by the reaction of lanthanum metals with nitrogen. Some nitride is produced along with the oxide, when lanthanum metals are ignited in air. Alternative methods of synthesis are a high temperature reaction of lanthanide metals with ammonia or the decomposition of lanthanide amides, Ln(NH2)3. Achieving pure stoichiometric compounds, and crystals with low defect density has proved difficult. The lanthanide nitrides are sensitive to air and hydrolyse producing ammonia.

The other pnictides phosphorus, arsenic, antimony and bismuth also react with the lanthanide metals to form monopnictides, LnQ, where Q = P, As, Sb or Bi. Additionally a range of other compounds can be produced with varying stoichiometries, such as LnP2, LnP5, LnP7, Ln3As, Ln5As3 and LnAs2.

Carbides
Carbides of varying stoichiometries are known for the lanthanides. Non-stoichiometry is common. All of the lanthanides form LnC2 and Ln2C3 which both contain C2 units. The dicarbides with exception of EuC2, are metallic conductors with the calcium carbide structure and can be formulated as Ln3+C22−(e–). The C-C bond length is longer than that in CaC2, which contains the C22− anion, indicating that the antibonding orbitals of the C22− anion are involved in the conduction band. These dicarbides hydrolyse to form hydrogen and a mixture of hydrocarbons. EuC2 and to a lesser extent YbC2 hydrolyse differently producing a higher percentage of acetylene (ethyne). The sesquicarbides, Ln2C3 can be formulated as Ln4(C2)3. 

These compounds adopt the Pu2C3 structure which has been described as having C22− anions in bisphenoid holes formed by eight near Ln neighbours. The lengthening of the C-C bond is less marked in the sesquicarbides than in the dicarbides, with the exception of Ce2C3.
Other carbon rich stoichiometries are known for some lanthanides. Ln3C4 (Ho-Lu) containing C, C2 and C3 units; Ln4C7 (Ho-Lu) contain C atoms and C3 units and Ln4C5 (Gd-Ho) containing C and C2 units.
Metal rich carbides contain interstitial C atoms and no C2 or C3 units. These are Ln4C3 (Tb and Lu); Ln2C (Dy, Ho, Tm) and Ln3C (Sm-Lu).

Borides
All of the lanthanides form a number of borides. The "higher" borides (LnBx where x > 12) are insulators/semiconductors whereas the lower borides are typically conducting. The lower borides have stoichiometries of LnB2, LnB4, LnB6 and LnB12. Applications in the field of spintronics are being investigated. The range of borides formed by the lanthanides can be compared to those formed by the transition metals. The boron rich borides are typical of the lanthanides (and groups 1–3) whereas for the transition metals tend to form metal rich, "lower" borides. The lanthanide borides are typically grouped together with the group 3 metals with which they share many similarities of reactivity, stoichiometry and structure. Collectively these are then termed the rare earth borides.

Many methods of producing lanthanide borides have been used, amongst them are direct reaction of the elements; the reduction of Ln2O3 with boron; reduction of boron oxide, B2O3, and Ln2O3 together with carbon; reduction of metal oxide with boron carbide, B4C. Producing high purity samples has proved to be difficult. Single crystals of the higher borides have been grown in a low melting metal (e.g. Sn, Cu, Al).

Diborides, LnB2, have been reported for Sm, Gd, Tb, Dy, Ho, Er, Tm, Yb and Lu. All have the same, AlB2, structure containing a graphitic layer of boron atoms. Low temperature ferromagnetic transitions for Tb, Dy, Ho and Er. TmB2 is ferromagnetic at 7.2 K.

Tetraborides, LnB4 have been reported for all of the lanthanides except EuB4, all have the same UB4 structure. The structure has a boron sub-lattice consists of chains of octahedral B6 clusters linked by boron atoms. The unit cell decreases in size successively from LaB4 to LuB4. The tetraborides of the lighter lanthanides melt with decomposition to LnB6. Attempts to make EuB4 have failed. The LnB4 are good conductors and typically antiferromagnetic.

Hexaborides, LnB6 have been reported for all of the lanthanides. They all have the CaB6 structure, containing B6 clusters. They are non-stoichiometric due to cation defects. The hexaborides of the lighter lanthanides (La – Sm) melt without decomposition, EuB6 decomposes to boron and metal and the heavier lanthanides decompose to LnB4 with exception of YbB6 which decomposes forming YbB12. The stability has in part been correlated to differences in volatility between the lanthanide metals. In EuB6 and YbB6 the metals have an oxidation state of +2 whereas in the rest of the lanthanide hexaborides it is +3. This rationalises the differences in conductivity, the extra electrons in the LnIII hexaborides entering conduction bands. EuB6 is a semiconductor and the rest are good conductors. LaB6 and CeB6 are thermionic emitters, used, for example, in scanning electron microscopes.

Dodecaborides, LnB12, are formed by the heavier smaller lanthanides, but not by the lighter larger metals, La – Eu. With the exception YbB12 (where Yb takes an intermediate valence and is a Kondo insulator), the dodecaborides are all metallic compounds. They all have the UB12 structure containing a 3 dimensional framework of cubooctahedral B12 clusters.

The higher boride LnB66 is known for all lanthanide metals. The composition is approximate as the compounds are non-stoichiometric. They all have similar complex structure with over 1600 atoms in the unit cell. The boron cubic sub lattice contains super icosahedra made up of a central B12 icosahedra surrounded by 12 others, B12(B12)12. Other complex higher borides LnB50 (Tb, Dy, Ho Er Tm Lu) and LnB25 are known (Gd, Tb, Dy, Ho, Er) and these contain boron icosahedra in the boron framework.

Organometallic compounds
Lanthanide-carbon σ bonds are well known; however as the 4f electrons have a low probability of existing at the outer region of the atom there is little effective orbital overlap, resulting in bonds with significant ionic character. As such organo-lanthanide compounds exhibit carbanion-like behavior, unlike the behavior in transition metal organometallic compounds. Because of their large size, lanthanides tend to form more stable organometallic derivatives with bulky ligands to give compounds such as Ln[CH(SiMe3)3]. Analogues of uranocene are derived from dilithiocyclooctatetraene, Li2C8H8. Organic lanthanide(II) compounds are also known, such as Cp*2Eu.

Physical properties

Magnetic and spectroscopic
All the trivalent lanthanide ions, except lanthanum and lutetium, have unpaired f electrons. However, the magnetic moments deviate considerably from the spin-only values because of strong spin-orbit coupling. The maximum number of unpaired electrons is 7, in Gd3+, with a magnetic moment of 7.94 B.M., but the largest magnetic moments, at 10.4–10.7 B.M., are exhibited by Dy3+ and Ho3+. However, in Gd3+ all the electrons have parallel spin and this property is important for the use of gadolinium complexes as contrast reagent in MRI scans.

Crystal field splitting is rather small for the lanthanide ions and is less important than spin-orbit coupling in regard to energy levels. Transitions of electrons between f orbitals are forbidden by the Laporte rule. Furthermore, because of the "buried" nature of the f orbitals, coupling with molecular vibrations is weak. Consequently, the spectra of lanthanide ions are rather weak and the absorption bands are similarly narrow. Glass containing holmium oxide and holmium oxide solutions (usually in perchloric acid) have sharp optical absorption peaks in the spectral range 200–900 nm and can be used as a wavelength calibration standard for optical spectrophotometers, and are available commercially.

As f-f transitions are Laporte-forbidden, once an electron has been excited, decay to the ground state will be slow. This makes them suitable for use in lasers as it makes the population inversion easy to achieve. The Nd:YAG laser is one that is widely used. Europium-doped yttrium vanadate was the first red phosphor to enable the development of color television screens. Lanthanide ions have notable luminescent properties due to their unique 4f orbitals. Laporte forbidden f-f transitions can be activated by excitation of a bound "antenna" ligand. This leads to sharp emission bands throughout the visible, NIR, and IR and relatively long luminescence lifetimes.

Occurrence

The lanthanide contraction is responsible for the great geochemical divide that splits the lanthanides into light and heavy-lanthanide enriched minerals, the latter being almost inevitably associated with and dominated by yttrium. This divide is reflected in the first two "rare earths" that were discovered: yttria (1794) and ceria (1803). The geochemical divide has put more of the light lanthanides in the Earth's crust, but more of the heavy members in the Earth's mantle. The result is that although large rich ore-bodies are found that are enriched in the light lanthanides, correspondingly large ore-bodies for the heavy members are few. The principal ores are monazite and bastnäsite. Monazite sands usually contain all the lanthanide elements, but the heavier elements are lacking in bastnäsite. The lanthanides obey the Oddo–Harkins rule – odd-numbered elements are less abundant than their even-numbered neighbors.

Three of the lanthanide elements have radioactive isotopes with long half-lives (138La, 147Sm and 176Lu) that can be used to date minerals and rocks from Earth, the Moon and meteorites.  Promethium is effectively a man-made element, as all its isotopes are radioactive with half-lives shorter than 20 years.

Applications

Industrial
Lanthanide elements and their compounds have many uses but the quantities consumed are relatively small in comparison to other elements. About 15000 ton/year of the lanthanides are consumed as catalysts and in the production of glasses. This 15000 tons corresponds to about 85% of the lanthanide production. From the perspective of value, however, applications in phosphors and magnets are more important.

The devices lanthanide elements are used in include superconductors, samarium-cobalt and neodymium-iron-boron high-flux rare-earth magnets, magnesium alloys, electronic polishers, refining catalysts and hybrid car components (primarily batteries and magnets). Lanthanide ions are used as the active ions in luminescent materials used in optoelectronics applications, most notably the Nd:YAG laser. Erbium-doped fiber amplifiers are significant devices in optical-fiber communication systems. Phosphors with lanthanide dopants are also widely used in cathode-ray tube technology such as television sets. The earliest color television CRTs had a poor-quality red; europium as a phosphor dopant made good red phosphors possible. Yttrium iron garnet (YIG) spheres can act as tunable microwave resonators. 

Lanthanide oxides are mixed with tungsten to improve their high temperature properties for TIG welding, replacing thorium, which was mildly hazardous to work with. Many defense-related products also use lanthanide elements such as night-vision goggles and rangefinders. The SPY-1 radar used in some Aegis equipped warships, and the hybrid propulsion system of s all use rare earth magnets in critical capacities.
The price for lanthanum oxide used in fluid catalytic cracking has risen from $5 per kilogram in early 2010 to $140 per kilogram in June 2011.

Most lanthanides are widely used in lasers, and as (co-)dopants in doped-fiber optical amplifiers; for example, in Er-doped fiber amplifiers, which are used as repeaters in the terrestrial and submarine fiber-optic transmission links that carry internet traffic. These elements deflect ultraviolet and infrared radiation and are commonly used in the production of sunglass lenses. Other applications are summarized in the following table:

The complex Gd(DOTA) is used in magnetic resonance imaging.

Life science
Lanthanide complexes can be used for optical imaging. Applications are limited by the lability of the complexes. 

Some applications depend on the unique luminescence properties of lanthanide chelates or cryptates). These are well-suited for this application due to their large Stokes shifts and extremely long emission lifetimes (from microseconds to milliseconds) compared to more traditional fluorophores (e.g., fluorescein, allophycocyanin, phycoerythrin, and rhodamine). 

The biological fluids or serum commonly used in these research applications contain many compounds and proteins which are naturally fluorescent. Therefore, the use of conventional, steady-state fluorescence measurement presents serious limitations in assay sensitivity. Long-lived fluorophores, such as lanthanides, combined with time-resolved detection (a delay between excitation and emission detection) minimizes prompt fluorescence interference.

Time-resolved fluorometry (TRF) combined with Förster resonance energy transfer (FRET) offers a powerful tool for drug discovery researchers: Time-Resolved Förster Resonance Energy Transfer or TR-FRET. TR-FRET combines the low background aspect of TRF with the homogeneous assay format of FRET. The resulting assay provides an increase in flexibility, reliability and sensitivity in addition to higher throughput and fewer false positive/false negative results.

This method involves two fluorophores: a donor and an acceptor. Excitation of the donor fluorophore (in this case, the lanthanide ion complex) by an energy source (e.g. flash lamp or laser) produces an energy transfer to the acceptor fluorophore if they are within a given proximity to each other (known as the Förster's radius). The acceptor fluorophore in turn emits light at its characteristic wavelength.

The two most commonly used lanthanides in life science assays are shown below along with their corresponding acceptor dye as well as their excitation and emission wavelengths and resultant Stokes shift (separation of excitation and emission wavelengths).

Possible medical uses
Currently there is research showing that lanthanide elements can be used as anticancer agents. The main role of the lanthanides in these studies is to inhibit proliferation of the cancer cells. Specifically cerium and lanthanum have been studied for their role as anti-cancer agents.

One of the specific elements from the lanthanide group that has been tested and used is cerium (Ce). There have been studies that use a protein-cerium complex to observe the effect of cerium on the cancer cells. The hope was to inhibit cell proliferation and promote cytotoxicity. Transferrin receptors in cancer cells, such as those in breast cancer cells and epithelial cervical cells, promote the cell proliferation and malignancy of the cancer. Transferrin is a protein used to transport iron into the cells and is needed to aid the cancer cells in DNA replication.  Transferrin acts as a growth factor for the cancerous cells and is dependent on iron. Cancer cells have much higher levels of transferrin receptors than normal cells and are very dependent on iron for their proliferation. 

Cerium has shown results as an anti-cancer agent due to its similarities in structure and biochemistry to iron.  Cerium may bind in the place of iron on to the transferrin and then be brought into the cancer cells by transferrin-receptor mediated endocytosis. The cerium binding to the transferrin in place of the iron inhibits the transferrin activity in the cell. This creates a toxic environment for the cancer cells and causes a decrease in cell growth. This is the proposed mechanism for cerium's effect on cancer cells, though the real mechanism may be more complex in how cerium inhibits cancer cell proliferation. Specifically in HeLa cancer cells studied in vitro, cell viability was decreased after 48 to 72 hours of cerium treatments. Cells treated with just cerium had decreases in cell viability, but cells treated with both cerium and transferrin had more significant inhibition for cellular activity.
Another specific element that has been tested and used as an anti-cancer agent is lanthanum, more specifically lanthanum chloride (LaCl3). The lanthanum ion is used to affect the levels of let-7a and microRNAs miR-34a in a cell throughout the cell cycle.  When the lanthanum ion was introduced to the cell in vivo or in vitro, it inhibited the rapid growth and induced apoptosis of the cancer cells (specifically cervical cancer cells). This effect was caused by the regulation of the let-7a and microRNAs by the lanthanum ions. The mechanism for this effect is still unclear but it is possible that the lanthanum is acting in a similar way as the cerium and binding to a ligand necessary for cancer cell proliferation.

Biological effects
Due to their sparse distribution in the earth's crust and low aqueous solubility, the lanthanides have a low availability in the biosphere, and for a long time were not known to naturally form part of any biological molecules. In 2007 a novel methanol dehydrogenase that strictly uses lanthanides as enzymatic cofactors was discovered in a bacterium from the phylum Verrucomicrobiota, Methylacidiphilum fumariolicum. This bacterium was found to survive only if there are lanthanides present in the environment. Compared to most other nondietary elements, non-radioactive lanthanides are classified as having low toxicity. The same nutritional requirement has also been observed Methylorubrum extorquens and Methylobacterium radiotolerans.

See also

References

Cited sources

External links
 lanthanide Sparkle Model, used in the computational chemistry of lanthanide complexes
 USGS Rare Earths Statistics and Information
 Ana de Bettencourt-Dias: Chemistry of the lanthanides and lanthanide-containing materials
 Eric Scerri, 2007, The periodic table: Its story and its significance, Oxford University Press, New York, 

Periodic table